Elliot Ballpark is a baseball stadium on the campus of the University of Connecticut (UConn) in Storrs, Connecticut, United States.  It is the home field of the UConn Huskies baseball team of NCAA Division I's Big East Conference.  The stadium is designed to seat 1,500 people, with additional space on grass berms which can also accommodate temporary bleachers.  It is named after former UConn baseball player Doug Elliot and his family, who provided a major gift towards the construction of the venue.

Elliot Ballpark replaced J. O. Christian Field as UConn's home field. The stadium was set to open during the 2020 season, however, UConn played no home games prior to the cancellation of the season due to the coronavirus pandemic. The first game at the ballpark was played on March 23, 2021, with UConn defeating Central Connecticut State by a score of 2-0.

See also
 List of NCAA Division I baseball venues

References

External links
 Elliot Ballpark

UConn Huskies baseball venues
Sports venues in Tolland County, Connecticut